The Beautiful Wife or Love's Sacrifice (Italian:La moglie bella) is a 1924 Italian silent film directed by Augusto Genina and starring Carmen Boni.

Cast
 Linda Moglia 
 Ruggero Ruggeri 
 Luigi Serventi 
 Carmen Boni 
 Carlo Tedeschi

References

Bibliography
 Stewart, John. Italian Film: A Who's Who. McFarland, 1994.

External links

1924 films
1920s Italian-language films
Films directed by Augusto Genina
Italian silent feature films
Italian black-and-white films